Terry Zwigoff (born May 18, 1949) is an American filmmaker whose work often deals with misfits, antiheroes, and themes of alienation. He first garnered attention for his work in documentary filmmaking with Louie Bluie (1985) and Crumb (1995). After Crumb, Zwigoff moved on to write and direct fiction feature films, including the Academy Award-nominated Ghost World (2001) and Bad Santa (2003).

Life and career

Early life and education 
Zwigoff was born in Appleton, Wisconsin, to a Jewish family of dairy farmers. He was raised in Chicago.

Underground comix scene 
Zwigoff moved to San Francisco in the 1970s and met cartoonist Robert Crumb, who shared his interest in pre-war American roots music. Zwigoff, who plays cello and mandolin (as well as the saw, and the Stroh violin), joined Crumb’s string band R. Crumb & His Cheap Suit Serenaders, with whom he recorded several records.

Zwigoff's friendship with Crumb led to his involvement in the underground comix scene. He initially edited the one-shot Funny Aminals [sic] #1 (Apex Novelties, 1972), the groundbreaking comic in which Art Spiegelman first introduced the characters and themes that would become Maus. In 1972–1973, Zwigoff operated Golden Gate, a small retailer and underground comix publisher (located at 429 Brazil Street in San Francisco). Golden Gate Publishing released three comics during this period, all of which heavily featured Crumb's work:
 The People's Comics (Sept. 1972) – all Crumb; features the story in which Fritz the Cat is killed
 Turned On Cuties (1972) – 28 pages of "pin-up" illustrations by Jay Lynch and a host of other San Francisco-based underground comix creators
 Artistic Comics (Mar. 1973) – 68 pp. of reproductions from Crumb's sketchbooks

Zwigoff later sold Golden Gate's publishing rights to Kitchen Sink Press.

From 1981 to 1984, Zwigoff helmed the letter column of Weirdo, a comics anthology edited by Crumb. "Weirdo's Advice to the Lovelorn" was written by Zwigoff, operating under the nom de plume of "Prof. T. E. Zwigoff".

Filmmaking career 
Zwigoff began his film career making documentary films, starting with 1985's Louie Bluie, a one-hour documentary about the blues and string band musician Howard Armstrong. Zwigoff had been inspired to locate and interview him after listening to a 30s recording, "State Street Rag", on which Armstrong played the mandolin.

Zwigoff worked on a documentary about R. Crumb and his two brothers for nine years, during which Zwigoff said he was "averaging an income of about $200 a month and living with back pain so intense that I spent three years with a loaded gun on the pillow next to my bed, trying to get up the nerve to kill myself." He completed Crumb in 1994; the critically acclaimed film won the Grand Jury Prize at the Sundance Film Festival, the DGA award, the NY Film Critics Circle Award, the LA Film Critics Award, and the National Society of Film Critics Award. Additionally, critic Gene Siskel named Crumb the best film of 1995 as did over ten other major film critics. It appeared on over 150 Ten Best Lists of important critics. When Crumb failed to receive an Oscar nomination, there was an outcry from the media which forced the Academy of Motion Picture Arts and Sciences to revamp their documentary nomination process that previously had been dominated by the distributors of documentary films.

Zwigoff’s first fiction feature film was the comedy-drama Ghost World, based on Daniel Clowes' graphic novel of the same name. For this, Zwigoff and co-writer Clowes were nominated for an Academy Award for Best Adapted Screenplay and won the Independent Spirit Award. Ghost World was also nominated for two Golden Globe Awards and two AFI awards. USA Today and The Washington Post called it the best film of the year. Ghost World appeared on over 150 Ten Best Lists.

Zwigoff’s next film was the 2003 black comedy Bad Santa whose star, Billy Bob Thornton, was nominated for a Golden Globe award. The film cost $23 million to make and grossed over $76 million worldwide.

His latest feature film was Art School Confidential,  whose best-known stars are John Malkovich, Jim Broadbent, and Anjelica Huston. Art School Confidential was Zwigoff’s second collaboration with writer Daniel Clowes.

In 2009, Zwigoff signed a petition in support of film director Roman Polanski, calling for his release after Polanski was arrested in Switzerland in relation to his 1977 charge for drugging and raping a then 13-year-old girl.

Unrealized projects
According to Vice, Zwigoff and Robert Crumb wrote an unproduced screenplay titled Sassy.

Zwigoff turned down the offer to direct  Elf (2003) in favor of directing  Bad Santa.

In July 2006, it was reported that Zwigoff was to write and direct a film adaptation of the French novel Happy Days by Laurent Graff.  Jerry Stahl was to have co-written the script with Zwigoff and the film was to have been produced by Johnny Depp via Infinitum Nihil and Graham King via Initial Entertainment Group.

In September 2007, it was reported that Zwigoff was to direct and co-write with Daniel Clowes a film titled The $40,000 Man for New Line Cinema.

In a 2012 interview with IndieWire, Zwigoff claimed he attempted to write and direct a film adaptation of the Elmore Leonard novel Maximum Bob.

In June 2013, it was reported that Zwigoff was to direct Fred Armisen in a film he co-wrote with Melissa Axelrod titled Justice for Al.

In July 2013, it was reported that Zwigoff was to direct a film he co-wrote with Melissa Axelrod titled Lost Melody with Edward R. Pressman producing and Nicolas Cage slated to star.

Zwigoff confirmed in a 2017 interview with Vanity Fair that he attempted to make Lem Dobbs’ unproduced script titled Edward Ford into a film with Michael Shannon slated to star.  According to Zwigoff, the film was never made because “the money fell through.”

Filmography

References

External links
 
 Interview in Now Playing
 "Terry Zwigoff's Santa: He's Making a List And Checking His Escape Routes Twice", from The New York Times

Independent Spirit Award winners
Writers from Appleton, Wisconsin
1949 births
Living people
Jewish American writers
Directors Guild of America Award winners
Film directors from Wisconsin
21st-century American Jews